William Avery Crawford (January 14, 1915 – December 14, 2001) was an American diplomat who served as the last Minister and first United States Ambassador to Romania, from 1962 to 1965.

Early life and education
Crawford was born on January 14, 1915; the son of John Raymond Crawford, a professor of Greek and Latin at Lafayette College, and Pauline Avery.

Educated abroad in France, he studied at Haverford College, and went abroad to Spain during the Spanish Civil War. He  graduated in 1936 with a Bachelor of Arts. He later studied at the Russian Institute, now known as the Harriman Institute, at Columbia University.

After graduation, Crawford worked at a department store before joining the diplomatic corps.

Diplomacy
Crawford joined the United States Foreign Service in 1941, serving in Moscow, Paris, Havana, and Prague. Although subjected to a loyalty investigation under Executive Order 9835 in 1951, he passed, and continued his work in the Foreign Service. He was chosen to be Minister in October 1961.

In February 1962, he presented his credentials as Minister, serving until the post was upgraded to Ambassador in 1964. During this time, he helped to support Romania-United States relations in the fields of trade and cultural exchange. 

He and his wife, Barbara, founded the American International School of Bucharest in 1962.

Crawford left his post in October 1965.

Later career
After Romania, Crawford was an assistant to Lyman Lemnitzer, the Supreme Allied Commander Europe, from 1965 to 1967. He retired from the Foreign Service in 1970.

He then taught at the Landon School, worked at a marketing company, finished his memoirs, and contributed to a biography on his mother.

Personal life and death
Crawford was married twice: first to Barbara Gardner, from October 19, 1940, till her death in September 1979; and then to Gudrun Hadell. 

From his first marriage, he had five children: three sons and two daughters.

Crawford died at his home on December 14, 2001, a month before his 87th birthday. He was survived by his children and his second wife.

References

External links
 William Avery Crawford at the Office of the Historian
 William Avery Crawford in the Biographic Register of the Department of State (1959), pp. 170-1

1915 births
2001 deaths
Ambassadors of the United States to Romania
Haverford College alumni
United States Foreign Service personnel
20th-century American diplomats
People from Bethesda, Maryland